50 Beale Street is a , 23-floor high-rise office building in the Financial District, San Francisco between Market Street and Mission Street. It is on the list of tallest buildings in San Francisco.

Completed in 1967, the building served as the world headquarters for Bechtel before the company moved to Reston, Virginia. The building has also served as headquarters for Blue Shield of California between 1996 and 2018. In 2006, Blue Shield renewed its lease and acquired naming rights to the building. The building has formerly been known as the Bechtel Building and subsequently the Blue Shield of California Building.

Broadway Partners acquired the building in 2007. A joint venture of The Rockefeller Group and Mitsubishi Estate New York acquired the building in September 2012. The building was sold to Paramount Group, Inc. for approximately  million in September 2014.

Tenants
 Bechtel
 Blue Shield of California
 Instacart
 VerticalResponse
 Zenefits
 San Francisco Health Authority/San Francisco Health Plan

See also

References

External links
 50 Beale Street - The Rockefeller Group

Financial District, San Francisco
Skyscraper office buildings in San Francisco
Skidmore, Owings & Merrill buildings
Office buildings completed in 1967